The following is a partial list of Military bridges 
 AM 50
 Armoured vehicle-launched bridge
 Bailey bridge
 Callender-Hamilton bridge
DSB Dry Support Bridge
 Mabey Logistic Support Bridge
 MGB Medium Girder Bridge
 Pontoon bridge

See also 
 Military engineer
 Military engineering

Military bridging equipment